John Silva (born 13 February 1977) is a Panamanian tennis player.

Silva makes appearances at the Visit Panamá Cup.

Silva represents Panama at the Davis Cup where he has a W/L record of 12–11.

References

External links

1977 births
Living people
Sportspeople from Panama City
Panamanian male tennis players